Anton Freissler, aka Anton Freißler (13 March 1838, in Kujavy – 29 February 1916, in Hinterbrühl) invented and developed a number of elevators including paternosters.

Biography

Freissler was born in Kujavy in northern Moravia, which was a part of Austrian empire. Freissler developed paternosters and other elevators, which were sold very successfully throughout the empire and abroad. One of the oldest paternosters, installed in 1911, is still in use in the House of Industry in Vienna.

Freissler was also issued an imperial warrant as a Purveyor to the Imperial and Royal Court.

The company existed until the 1970s until it was incorporated into Otis Austria.

See also
 List of elevator manufacturers

External links

1838 births
1916 deaths
People from Nový Jičín District
People from the Margraviate of Moravia
Moravian-German people
Austrian people of Moravian-German descent
19th-century Austrian people
20th-century Austrian people
Austrian businesspeople
Manufacturing companies of Austria
Elevator manufacturers
Purveyors to the Imperial and Royal Court